Kampong Parit is a village in Amo, a mukim (subdistrict) in Temburong District, Brunei. The postcode for Kampong Parit is PD2351.

Name 
Kampong Parit comes from the Malay name which translates as 'Parit Village'.

References 

Parit